Owen Farnworth (born 11 February 1999) is a professional rugby league footballer who plays as a prop for the Widnes Vikings in the Betfred Championship.

In 2017 he made his Super League début for Widnes against the Leeds Rhinos.

References

External links
Widnes Vikings profile
SL profile
Leeds Rhinos v Widnes Vikings

1999 births
Living people
English rugby league players
Rugby league players from Preston, Lancashire
Rugby league props
Widnes Vikings players